The Calgary Hitmen are a major junior ice hockey team based in Calgary, Alberta, Canada. The Hitmen play in the Central Division of the Western Hockey League (WHL). They play their home games at the Scotiabank Saddledome.  Bret "The Hitman" Hart, a local-born professional wrestler, was a founding owner as well as the inspiration for the team's name.  Established in 1994, the team has been owned by the Calgary Flames hockey club since 1997. They are the third WHL team to represent Calgary, preceded by the Centennials and Wranglers.

The Hitmen have finished with the best record in the WHL four times, and qualified for the playoffs for thirteen consecutive seasons between 1998 and 2010. In 1999, they became the first Calgary team to win the President's Cup as league champions, and the first to represent the city in the Memorial Cup since the Calgary Canadians won the national junior title in 1926. The Hitmen hold numerous WHL attendance records, and in 2004–05 became the first team in Canadian Hockey League history to average 10,000 fans per game. Thirty-nine former Hitmen players have gone on to play in the National Hockey League.

Franchise history 
Graham James left his position as coach and general manager of the Swift Current Broncos to found the Hitmen in 1994. He organized a group of eighteen investors in the club, including star National Hockey League players Theoren Fleury and Joe Sakic, along with Bret Hart, famous for his exploits in the World Wrestling Federation. The Calgary Flames, who had just assumed control of the then Saddledome and were looking to fill extra dates in the building, were receptive to the new team.

Calgary had been without a WHL team since the Wranglers moved south to become the Lethbridge Hurricanes in 1987. The league's expansion into Calgary was met with scepticism, as the league had previously failed in Western Canada's largest markets of  Vancouver, Edmonton, Calgary, and Winnipeg, when in competition with the NHL.

The Stampede Corral has served as a second home for the odd home game when the Saddledome is unavailable. They used the Corral for regular season home games in 1995–1996 and playoff games in 1998 and 2016.

Controversial beginnings 

The club selected its name and logo as an homage to Bret "The Hitman" Hart. The team's distinctive pink, grey and black jerseys were also modelled after Hart's ring attire. The logo proved immensely popular and Hitmen merchandise sold well at many local retailers. However, the name and logo were also subject to heavy criticism from segments of the public and the business community, who panned both as negative stereotypes of violence within the sport. Among the chief critics of the new logo was the Flames organization.  They had received calls from concerned business people over theme and shared that sentiment. Struggling to attract corporate sponsors, the Hitmen chose to scrap the "Jason Voorhees"-style logo in favour of an alternate "starburst" logo just two months after it was unveiled. The club went back to the original logo in 1996.

The Hitmen entered their first season playing in the newly formed Central Division, and were predicted to finish as high as third in the five-team division. Instead, they finished as the second-worst regular season team in the league, posting an 18–51–3 record. The Hitmen lost CAD$250,000 in their first season and saw their season ticket base halved to 700 for the 1996–97 season. The losses led to questions about the viability of the club.

Two days later, the Calgary Police Service revealed that James was being investigated on allegations he sexually abused two former players while he was with the Swift Current Broncos. James was charged, and in  pleaded guilty to two counts of sexual assault. Upon James' conviction, and sentencing to 3½ years in prison, the Hitmen attempted to distance themselves from their former coach.

The Hitmen struggled on the ice as well, again missing the playoffs after falling to a record of 15–53–4. The spectre of the Graham James scandal hurt the franchise. It was widely speculated that the new owners would change the team name, possibly to the Junior Flames, however they chose to retain the name although they adopted a new colour scheme and updated the logo.

First championship 

Dean Clark took over as head coach shortly after James' resignation, and led the 1997–98 Hitmen to a remarkable turnaround. The team improved to a 40–28–4 record and first-place finish in the Central Division, qualifying for the playoffs for the first time in franchise history. They defeated the Saskatoon Blades and Swift Current Broncos to reach the Eastern Conference final before falling to the Brandon Wheat Kings. Clark was awarded the Dunc McCallum Memorial Trophy as the WHL's top coach, and also won the Canadian Hockey League's Brian Kilrea Coach of the Year Award. Calgary improved to 51–13–8 in 1998–99, finishing one point ahead of the Kamloops Blazers for the regular season title. Led by Brad Moran, Pavel Brendl and goaltender Alexandre Fomitchev, the Hitmen lost just five games in the playoffs en route to their first league championship. They won the title at home before a WHL playoff record crowd of 17,139. They became the first Calgary-based team to qualify for the Memorial Cup since the Calgary Canadians won the 1926 title.

In the 1999 Memorial Cup, the Hitmen opened their tournament with a 5–3 victory over the Ontario Hockey League's Belleville Bulls, followed by a 4–3 loss to the host Ottawa 67's. They followed with a 3–1 win over the Acadie-Bathurst Titan of the Quebec Major Junior Hockey League. Finishing atop the round robin standings, the Hitmen earned a bye into the championship game, and a rematch against the 67's. The championship game was a back-and-forth affair. Ottawa held 4–1 and 6–5 leads, while Calgary led 5–4 at one point and tied the game late to send it to overtime. The Hitmen fell short of winning the title however, as Ottawa's Matt Zultek scored the winning goal 1:58 into overtime. Brendl and Matt Kinch were named to the Memorial Cup All-Star team.

The Hitmen entered the 1999–2000 season with a strong squad, along with expectations at making another run to the Memorial Cup. The club finished the regular season with a record of 58–12–2–2, once again winning the regular season title. The team set franchise records for victories (58) and points (120), which stood until the 2008–09 year. After sweeping the Moose Jaw Warriors and Saskatoon Blades, the Hitmen were upset by the Kootenay Ice in the Eastern Conference final, falling four games to one.

2000s 

The Hitmen went through a rebuilding period and finished third or fourth in the Central Division between 2001 and 2004, winning only one playoff series during that time.  The Hitmen acquired goaltender Justin Pogge from the Prince George Cougars during the 2004–05 season. Pogge's goaltending, along with the offensive leadership of forward Andrew Ladd, saw the Hitmen win their first playoff series in four years. They could not follow up on their victory over the Lethbridge Hurricanes, however, losing their second round series against the Brandon Wheat Kings in seven games.

The Hitmen were heavily marketed by the Flames during the National Hockey League's 2004–05 lock-out. As a result, the Hitmen averaged 10,062 fans per game and set a new league attendance record. The season total of 362,227 fans smashed the old record by over 45,000. The Hitmen became the first Canadian Hockey League team to average over 10,000 fans per game, having the highest average attendance of any hockey team—junior or professional—in North America that year.

The 2005–06 Hitmen battled the Medicine Hat Tigers for the top spot in the Western Hockey League for most of the season. Calgary finished with 101 points, their best total since 1999–2000, however, finishing two points behind Medicine Hat for the best record in the league. The team again disappointed in the playoffs, falling to the Moose Jaw Warriors in the Eastern Conference semi-final. Pogge's performance during the season earned him honours as both the WHL player of the year and CHL goaltender of the year. Calgary fell to third in the Central Division in 2006–07. In the playoffs, they upset the Kootenay Ice, who finished 19-points ahead of Calgary in the regular season. The Hitmen then defeated the East Division champion Brandon Wheat Kings to reach the Eastern Conference final for the fourth time in franchise history, where they were subsequently defeated by the Tigers.

The Hitmen entered the 2007–08 season with expectations of being strong contenders, voted the pre-season pick to finish atop the Eastern Conference by the league's coaches and general managers. The team lived up to expectations, winning the Central Division, and finishing with the best record in the East for the first time since 2000. During a late season game, Calgary broke the league's single-game attendance record, as an announced crowd of 19,305 watched Calgary defeat Kootenay by a score of 6 goals to 1.  In the playoffs, the Hitmen defeated the Moose Jaw Warriors and Swift Current Broncos in six games apiece, advancing to the Eastern Conference finals for the second consecutive season.

Second championship 

Following the graduation of several players, including Karl Alzner, who was named both WHL player of the year and CHL defenceman of the year, the 2008–09 Hitmen were expected to enter a rebuilding period.  Instead, they captured the franchise's third Scotty Munro Memorial Trophy as the regular season champion, earning the top seed in the playoffs. The team tied or broke 21 franchise records during the regular season, including wins (59), points (122) and goals for (330).  Joel Broda led the league with 53 goals, while Brandon Kozun and Brett Sonne finished second and third in league scoring with 108 and 100 points respectively; it was only the second time in franchise history that two players topped the 100-point mark in the same season.  In the playoffs, the Hitmen won 12 straight games, sweeping the Edmonton Oil Kings, Lethbridge Hurricanes and Brandon Wheat Kings to reach the WHL finals for the first time since 1999. In the finals, they were stunned by the Kelowna Rockets, losing the first three games of the series before winning the next two to extend the series to a sixth game.  The Hitmen lost game six in overtime, and the series 4–2, to end their season. Sonne was named WHL Player of the Year, while General Manager Kelly Kisio was named Executive of the Year for the second time in recognition of the Hitmen's season.

Calgary again finished with the best record in the regular season with 107 points on the strength of Kozun's CHL leading 107 points and the goaltending of Martin Jones, who was named goaltender of the year in the WHL. The Hitmen's playoffs nearly ended quickly as they lost three of the first four games in their opening round playoff series against the Warriors before winning three consecutive games to take the series in seven. They then beat the Tigers and Wheat Kings in six and five games respectively to reach the WHL championship series for the second consecutive year. Entering the final against the Tri-City Americans, the 11 players who returned from the 2009 finals lost vowed not to suffer a repeat of their disappointing finish to the previous season. Named the playoff MVP, Jones allowed only seven goals against in the final as the Hitmen defeated the Americans in five games to win their second Ed Chynoweth Cup in franchise history. The victory, in front of a home crowd of over 15,000 fans, earned the Hitmen a berth in the 2010 Memorial Cup tournament.  At the tournament, Calgary posted a 2–1 record in the round robin, defeating the QMJHL's Moncton Wildcats and the host Brandon Wheat Kings, but lost the semi-final in overtime, also against Brandon.

Following the graduation of many of the team's top scorers, the Hitmen fell to last place the WHL in 2010–11, at one point tying a franchise record with 12 consecutive losses.   As part of the 2011 Heritage Classic, the Hitmen hosted the Regina Pats in an outdoor game at McMahon Stadium on February 21, 2011. Regina won 3–2 before 20,888 fans, setting new WHL and CHL attendance records, and proving the highest attended junior game of all-time.

In 2019, the Hitmen hosted the Corral Series, a three-game series paying tribute to former teams that used to play in the Corral.

Community impact 

The Hitmen are active within the community, supporting numerous programs and charities. They host an annual teddy bear toss each December. The bears are donated to charities throughout the Calgary area. A few of the bears are personally delivered by the players to the Alberta Children's Hospital, an event highly anticipated by patients attending the hospital.

The Hitmen are also partners with the Calgary Board of Education and their Read On! Literacy for Life program. Red Deer, Alberta author Sigmund Brouwer has released numerous young adult-oriented mystery novels about the team and fictitious Hitmen players. The ninth book in the series, titled Hitmen Star, was published in 2008. Copies of the books are distributed to sixth grade students throughout Calgary and southern Alberta schools; with Hitmen and former National Hockey League players helping to encourage students to take an active interest in reading.

Current roster 

 
	
 

 

 

 

 
  

  
  

 
 

 
 

|}

Season-by-season record 
Note: GP = Games played, W = Wins, L = Losses, T = Ties, OTL = Overtime losses, SOL = Shootout losses, Pts = Points, GF = Goals for, GA = Goals against

NHL alumni 

Thirty-eight players have been selected from the Hitmen roster at the National Hockey League's entry drafts. Of those, nine players were selected in the first round. The highest drafted players in club history were Pavel Brendl (1999) and Andrew Ladd (2004). Both players were selected fourth overall.

Forty-four former Hitmen players have gone on to play in the National Hockey League. The first was Ryan Bast, who played two games with the Philadelphia Flyers in 1998–99. Andrew Ladd has gone on to win two Stanley Cup championships since graduating: with the Carolina Hurricanes in 2006 and the Chicago Blackhawks in 2010. His former Hitmen teammate, Ryan Getzlaf won the Cup with the Anaheim Ducks in 2007, and former New York Islanders teammate Johnny Boychuk has one as a member of the 2011 Boston Bruins.

Head coaches 
Dean Clark has thus far been the most successful coach for the Calgary Hitmen. He led the team between 1996 and 2001, and in that time won more WHL games than any other coach. He was named coach of the year in both the WHL and CHL in 1998. Clark led the Hitmen to three division titles, two regular season titles, one league championship, and coached the Hitmen to their first Memorial Cup final. Kelly Kisio is the team's former head coach from the 2004–05 season to the end of the 2007–08 season, a role he shared with Dean Evason in his first year at the helm of the Hitmen. Kisio stepped down as coach in 2008, naming former assistant Dave Lowry, as head coach for the 2008–09 season.  Lowry was promoted to an assistant with the Calgary Flames after leading the Hitmen to a 122-point season in his rookie year. He was replaced by Mike Williamson, who led the team to a WHL championship in 2010 but left the team in 2014. He was followed by Mark French.

Individual records 

Season
 Most goals, 73, Pavel Brendl, 1998–99
 Most assists, 72, Brad Moran, 1999–2000
 Most points, 134, Pavel Brendl, 1998–99
 Most penalty minutes: 302, Ryan Andres, 1997–98
 Best goals against average, 1.72, Justin Pogge, 2005–06
 Most shutouts, 11, Justin Pogge, 2005–06
 Most games played, goaltender: 60, Alexandre Fomitchev, 1997–98
 Most saves, goaltender: 1,481, Alexandre Fomitchev, 1997–98

Career
 Most goals: 204, Brad Moran, 1995–00
 Most assists: 246, Brad Moran, 1995–00
 Most points: 450, Brad Moran, 1995–00
 Most penalty minutes: 704, Mike Egener, 2000–04
 Most games played, individual: 357, Brad Moran, 1995–2000
 Best goals against average: 1.92, Justin Pogge, 2004–06
 Most shutouts: 16, Martin Jones, 2006–10
 Most games played, goaltender: 179, Dan Spence, 2004–08
 Most saves, goaltender: 3390, Chris Driedger, 2011–14

Team records

Awards and honours 

The Calgary Hitmen have captured numerous awards during the franchise's tenure. Hitmen players have been named the WHL's most outstanding player four times. Defenceman Karl Alzner won the Four Broncos Memorial Trophy in 2007–08, also named the defenceman of the year, and Brett Sonne won the trophy in 2008–09.  Goaltender Martin Jones captured numerous awards in Calgary's championship season of 2009–10, including being named the top goaltender of the Memorial Cup, and Brandon Kozun led the entire Canadian Hockey League in scoring.

As a whole, the Hitmen have won the Central Division six times, and four times have been the regular season champions. Brad Moran, the franchise's all-time leading scorer, had his number 20 retired in 2005, the first player to be so honoured. Following the lead of the Calgary Flames, the team introduced a new program in 2015 to honour former players.  Called "Forever a Hitmen", the team named Ryan Getzlaf the first inductee.

Ed Chynoweth Cup
 Western Hockey League champions
 1998–99, 2009–10

Scotty Munro Memorial Trophy
 Regular season champions
 1998–99, 1999–2000, 2008–09, 2009–10

Central Division titles
 1997–98, 1998–99, 1999–2000
 2007–08, 2008–09, 2009–10

Four Broncos Memorial Trophy
 Player of the year
 Brad Moran: 1999–2000
 Justin Pogge: 2005–06
 Karl Alzner: 2007–08
 Brett Sonne: 2008–09

Bob Clarke Trophy
 Top scorer
 Pavel Brendl: 1998–99
 Brad Moran: 1999–2000
 Brandon Kozun: 2009–10

Daryl K. (Doc) Seaman Trophy
 Scholastic player of the year
 Chris Nielsen: 1998–99, 1999–2000

Brad Hornung Trophy
Most sportsmanlike player
 Matt Kinch: 1998–99, 2000–01

Bill Hunter Memorial Trophy
 Defenceman of the year
 Brad Stuart: 1998–99
 Karl Alzner: 2007–08

CHL Defenceman of the Year
 Brad Stuart: 1998–99
 Karl Alzner: 2007–08

Jim Piggott Memorial Trophy
 Rookie of the year
 Pavel Brendl: 1998–99

CHL Top Draft Prospect Award
 Pavel Brendl: 1998–99
Del Wilson Trophy
 Goaltender of the year
 Justin Pogge: 2005–06
 Martin Jones: 2009–10

CHL Goaltender of the Year
 Justin Pogge: 2005–06

Hap Emms Memorial Trophy
 Top goaltender at the Memorial Cup
 Martin Jones: 2010

Dunc McCallum Memorial Trophy
 Coach of the year
 Dean Clark: 1997–98

Brian Kilrea Coach of the Year Award
 CHL coach of the year
 Dean Clark: 1997–98

Lloyd Saunders Memorial Trophy
 Executive of the year
 Kelly Kisio: 2003–04, 2008–09

Doug Wickenheiser Memorial Trophy
 Humanitarian of the year
 Chris Nielsen: 1999–2000
 Cody Sylvester: 2012–13

WHL Playoff MVP
 Brad Moran: 1999
 Martin Jones: 2010

WHL Plus-Minus Award
 Top plus-minus
 Pavel Brendl: 1998–99
 Kenton Smith: 1999–2000
 Andrew Ladd: 2003–04
 Clark Smith: 2004-05
 Paul Postma: 2008–09

St. Clair Group Trophy
 Top marketing/public relations department
 Mark Stiles: 2003–04
 Kip Reghenas: 2007–08

See also 
 List of ice hockey teams in Alberta
 Ice hockey in Calgary

Notes

References 
 Standings and team records – 
 Roster –

External links 

 Official website of the Calgary Hitmen

1995 establishments in Alberta
Bret Hart
Calgary Flames minor league affiliates
Ice hockey clubs established in 1995
Ice hockey teams in Alberta
Hitmen, Calgary
Western Hockey League teams
Calgary Sports and Entertainment